Kuwait Open may refer to:

Kuwait PSA Cup, a men's squash tournament formerly known as the Kuwait Open
Kuwait Open (table tennis), a table tennis tournament